Events in the year 1833 in Norway.

Incumbents
Monarch: Charles III John

Events
4 August - Norderhov Spareindretning, Ringerikes first bank is established (today it is known as SpareBank 1 Ringerike Hadeland).

Arts and literature

Births
5 January – Sophus Bugge, philologist (d.1907)
29 June – Peter Waage, chemist and professor (d.1900)
6 July – Christian Andreas Irgens, politician (d.1915)
10 August – Peter Laurentius Larsen, Norwegian-American Lutheran Educator (d. 1915 in America)
6 November – Jonas Lie, novelist (d.1908)

Full date unknown
Hans Olsen Hafsrød, politician
Peder Johan Pedersen Holmesland, politician
Nils Pedersen Igland, farmer and politician (d.1898)
Jacob Thurmann Ihlen, politician (d.1903)
Jacob Otto Lange, politician and Minister (d.1902)
Oluf Rygh, archeologist, philologist and historian (d.1899)
Peter Olrog Schjøtt, philologist and politician (d.1926)

Deaths

 7 April – Jørgen Aall, ship-owner and politician (b.1771)

Full date unknown
Ole Olsen Evenstad, politician (b.1766)
Niels Treschow, philosopher and politician (b.1751)

See also